Shamary is a rural locality (a village) in Klenovskoye Selsoviet, Bolshesosnovsky District, Perm Krai, Russia. The population was 17 as of 2010. There is 1 street.

Geography 
Shamary is located 15 km northwest of Bolshaya Sosnova (the district's administrative centre) by road. Zabolotovo is the nearest rural locality.

References 

Rural localities in Bolshesosnovsky District